Avon is an unincorporated community located in Saline Township in Sainte Genevieve County, Missouri, United States. Avon is located 20 miles southwest of Ste. Genevieve.

Etymology

Although the derivation of Avon's name is unknown, an admirer of Shakespeare may have chosen it, taking it from Shakespeare’s hometown Stratford-upon-Avon.

History 

Avon was first established as a lead mining camp, using furnaces to process the lead.
A post office was in operation in Avon between 1849 and 1928. In 1925, Avon had 21 inhabitants.

References 

Unincorporated communities in Ste. Genevieve County, Missouri
Unincorporated communities in Missouri
1849 establishments in Missouri